The 2012 Hazfi Cup Final was the 25th edition of the Hazfi Cup since 1975. The match between Esteghlal and Shahin Bushehr took place on 15 March 2012 at the Hafezieh Stadium. Esteghlal beat Shahin Bushehr 4-1 on penalties and qualified for the 2013 AFC Champions League.

Format
The rules for the final was exactly the different as the one for the previous knockout rounds. The tie was contested over one legs. If the teams could still not be separated, then extra time would have been played with a penalty shootout (taking place if the teams were still level after that). Both teams have agreed Hafezieh Stadium in Shiraz as the final venue but it was announced that because of Hafezieh's ground qualify in winter, the final match will be transferred to the newly established Ghadir Stadium in Ahvaz. It was later denied.

Road to the finals

Match

Shahin was qualified for the first time to the final but it was Esteghlal's 9th final performance. The match was scoreless after 120 minutes but there had been numerous scoring chances on both sides. Mehdi Noori had a good chance in the first half and shot for the goal but was hit to the goalpostwas. In the second half, Fereydoun Zandi, Arash Borhani and Jlloyd Samuel had many chances but all of them was kept out with a one-handed save by Shahin goalkeeper Vahid Talebloo, a former Esteghlal player. Ali Ansarian's shot was forced saves by Esteghlal goalkeeper Mehdi Rahmati. The game was end 0-0 and was advanced to the extra times.

In the extra times, both team tried to have an aggressive play in order to scoring the winning goal. In 112, Milad Meydavoudi hit a free kick but was saved by defensive wall. Goran Jerković also had a chance but was out of the gate.

The Blues proved to be the superior side with all four of their penalty takers converting from the spot, while only one of the three Shahin players stepping behind the ball withstood the pressure and summoned the necessary composure to score. In the penalties, Mohsen Yousefi, a left foot Midfielder scored Esteghlal's first goal. After that Mehdi Noori's shoot was out of target. Then, Fereydoun Zandi, a German-Iranian footballer, scored the second goal for Esteghlal. Shokouhmagham was behind the wall but his shoot was saved by Mehdi Rahmati. Jlloyd Samuel scored Esteghlal's third goal. Ali Ansarian scored for Shahin the first goal but Goran Jerković converted the winning penalty and Esteghlal won the trophy 4-1.

Match details 

|valign="top"|

Champions

See also 
 2011–12 Iran Pro League
 2011–12 Azadegan League
 2011–12 Iran Football's 2nd Division
 2011–12 Iran Football's 3rd Division
 2011–12 Hazfi Cup
 Super Cup 2012
 2011–12 Iranian Futsal Super League

References

2012
Haz
Esteghlal F.C. matches